St Clair George Alfred Donaldson (11 February 1863 – 7 December 1935) was an English Anglican bishop. He was the first Anglican Archbishop of Brisbane, Australia.

Early life
Donaldson was the third son of Sir Stuart Alexander Donaldson and his wife Amelia née Cowper and was born in London, England. He was educated at Eton, where he rowed in the eight, and at Trinity College, Cambridge. He narrowly missed representing Cambridge in the 1883 boat race, when having been selected stroke of the crew he fell ill and was forbidden to row by the doctors. He graduated B.A. in 1885 with a first class degree in classics and obtained a first class in theology in 1887.

Career
Donaldson was ordained deacon in 1888 and priest in 1889. After a short while as a curate at Bethnal Green he was a domestic chaplain to archbishop Benson from 1888 to 1891. In 1891 Donaldson became vicar of St Mary's, Hackney Wick, and was head of the Eton Mission until 1900. He was in November 1901 appointed Rector of Hornsey, and in October the following year also as Rural Dean of Hornsey, serving from 1902 to 1904. At only 41 years of age he was chosen to be Bishop of Brisbane, was consecrated on 28 October 1904, and arrived at Brisbane on 19 December 1904. On St Thomas Day, 21 December 1904, he was enthroned as Bishop of Brisbane in St Luke's Church of England in Charlotte Street, Brisbane, as the diocese's cathedral had not yet been completed.

When Donaldson began his episcopate he found that over £30,000 was on hand for the building of St John's Cathedral. He immediately set to work to raise the remaining necessary funds, and six years later the cathedral was consecrated. In 1905 the five dioceses in Queensland and New Guinea were formed into a province, and Donaldson became Archbishop of Brisbane. He interested himself especially in the development of the theological college, in religions instruction in schools, and in the founding of church schools. He gave much time and thought to the diocesan war memorial, which eventually took the form of St Martin's Hospital near the cathedral. About £100,000 was raised for this including a gift of £1000 from Donaldson himself. Donalson gave attention to moral causes of industrial unrest and the 'inward spiritual significance of the Labour movement', and he offered to mediate in the 1912 Brisbane general strike. Donaldson spoke strongly on the question of justice to the aborigines, urging that a large tract of land should be handed to them which whites should not be allowed to occupy. During his episcopate of 17 years the number of clergy increased from 55 to well over 100.

In 1921 he was appointed Bishop of Salisbury, and on his return to England was pronounced by Arthur Benson to be "a very fine, simple-minded, robust, sensible prelate". At Salisbury as at Brisbane he became the trusted friend of his clergy and no parish was too isolated to be visited. He did work in convocation and was for many years chairman of the board of missions.

Late life
Donaldson had a difficult task as chairman of the joint committee of the Canterbury convocation on "The Church and Marriage", which sat from 1931 until 1935. In 1933 he was appointed by the King Prelate of the Order of St Michael and St George. He held the honorary degrees of D.D. of Oxford and Cambridge, and D.C.L. Durham. After leaving Australia he retained his interest in his old diocese and continued to make monetary contributions to its needs. In his will £4000 was left to endowment funds of the Brisbane diocese. He died suddenly at Salisbury on 7 December 1935 aged 72. He was unmarried.

References

Betty Crouchley, 'Donaldson, St Clair George Alfred (1863 - 1935)', Australian Dictionary of Biography, Vol.8, MUP, 1981, pp 319–320.

External links
Donaldson at ThePeerage

1863 births
1935 deaths
People educated at Eton College
Anglican archbishops of Brisbane
20th-century Church of England bishops
20th-century Anglican archbishops
20th-century Anglican bishops in Australia